Ed Stafford may refer to:

People
 Ed Stafford (born 1975) British explorer
 Edwin Stafford Nelson (1928-2014) U.S. actor
 Edmund Stafford (disambiguation)
 Edward Stafford (disambiguation)

Other uses
 Ed Stafford: Into The Unknown (TV series) 2015 Discovery Channel documentary series

See also

 Stafford (surname)
 
 Stafford (disambiguation)
 Ed (disambiguation)